Shi Zhenglu (born February 1963) is a lieutenant general in the People's Liberation Army of China.

He was a representative of the 19th National Congress of the Chinese Communist Party. He was an alternate member of the 19th Central Committee of the Chinese Communist Party and is an alternate member of the 20th Central Committee of the Chinese Communist Party.

Biography
He served in the Jinan Military Region for a long time. In 2008, he led his troops to participate in disaster relief and rescue missions in Wenchuan earthquake stricken areas. He was promoted to chief of staff of the 54th Group Army (now 83rd Group Army) for his actions at the disaster relief and rescue missions. In November 2012, he became deputy commander of the army. He was deputy chief of staff of the Jinan Military Region in September 2014 and subsequently commander of the 54th Group Army in December 2014. He was appointed deputy commander of the Northern Theater Command in January 2017, concurrently serving as chief of staff. In December 2020, he was made commander of the Northern Theater Command Ground Force.

He was promoted to the rank of major general (shaojiang) in July 2010 and lieutenant general (zhongjiang) in July 2018.

References

1963 births
Living people
People from Daye
People's Liberation Army generals from Hubei
People's Republic of China politicians from Hubei
Chinese Communist Party politicians from Hubei
Alternate members of the 19th Central Committee of the Chinese Communist Party
Alternate members of the 20th Central Committee of the Chinese Communist Party